Nicolae Munteanu can refer to:

 Nicolae Munteanu (footballer)
 Nicolae Munteanu (handball)
 Nicolae Munteanu (ski jumper)